El Deseo S.A. is a film production company owned by the Almodóvar brothers (Pedro and Agustín). The company has financed all the films directed by Pedro starting from The Law of Desire in 1987 but has also produced films not directed by the manchego director, in particular it has given the opportunity to debut a new generation of filmmakers such as Álex de la Iglesia and Isabel Coixet.

The American Film Institute celebrated El Deseo's 25th anniversary in Los Angeles.

Filmography

Film 

 Law of Desire (1987)
 Women on the Verge of a Nervous Breakdown (1988)
 Tie Me Up! Tie Me Down! (1990)
 High Heels (1991)
 Acción mutante (1993)
 The Flower of My Secret (1995)
 Live Flesh (1997)
 Messieurs les enfants (1997)
 All About My Mother (1999)
 The Devil's Backbone (2001)
 Loco Fever (2001)
 Talk to Her (2002)
 My Life Without Me (2003)
 Bad Education (2004)
 The Holy Girl (2004)
 Volver (2006)
 The Headless Woman (2008)
 My Prison Yard (2008)
 Broken Embraces (2009)
 José and Pilar (2010)
 I'm So Excited (2013)
 Wild Tales (2014)
 The Clan (2015)
 Julieta (2016)
 Zama (2017)
 El Angel (2018)
 The Silence of Others (2018)
 Pain and Glory (2019)
 The Human Voice (2020)
 Parallel Mothers (2021)
 It Snows in Benidorm (2021)
 Strange Way of Life (2023)

Television 
 Mujeres (2006)
 Mentiras pasajeras (TBD)

References

External links
 

Film production companies of Spain
Castilian cinema
Companies based in Madrid
Mass media in Madrid
Entertainment companies established in 1986
Mass media companies established in 1986
1986 establishments in Spain